Mons is a city in Belgium.

Mons or MONS may also refer to:

Places

France
 Mons, Charente, a commune in the Charente département
 Mons, Charente-Maritime, a commune in the Charente-Maritime département
 Mons, Gard, a commune in the Gard département
 Mons, Haute-Garonne, a commune in the Haute-Garonne département
 Mons, Hérault, a commune in the Hérault département
 Mons, Puy-de-Dôme, a commune in the Puy-de-Dôme département
 Mons, Var, a commune in the Var département
 Mons-Boubert, a commune in the Somme département
 Mons-en-Barœul, a commune in the Nord département
 Mons-en-Laonnois, a commune in the Aisne département
 Mons-en-Montois, a commune in the Seine-et-Marne département
 Mons-en-Pévèle, a commune in the Nord département

Elsewhere 
 Mons, Queensland, Australia, a suburb of the Sunshine Coast
 Mons, Graubünden, Switzerland, a village

People
 Mons (name), list of people with the name

Other uses 
 Mons Records, a jazz record-label in Germany
 Battle of Mons, a 1914 World War I battle in Mons, Belgium
 Mons (film), a 1926 British silent film 
 Mons (planetary nomenclature), in planetary nomenclature: a sizable extraterrestrial mountain
 Mons (Walloon Parliament constituency), in Belgium
 Mons Officer Cadet School, a British Army training establishment, 1947–1972
 Mons pubis (mons Venus or mons veneris), in mammalian anatomy, the adipose tissue lying above the pubic bone
 Mons., abbreviation of Monsignor, an honour within the Catholic Church
 Ministry of National Security (Grenada) (MONS), the interior ministry of the government of Grenada

See also 
 Mon (disambiguation)
 Mons Affair, an 18th-century episode in Russian history
 Mons Meg, a medieval bombard located at Edinburgh Castle, Scotland